Maria del Mar (born Maria Morales) is a Canadian rock singer from Toronto, who was the lead vocalist for 1980s & 1990s goth rock band National Velvet. Following National Velvet's break from performing, del Mar continued to be a figure in the Canadian indie rock scene.

Maria studied as a hairstylist in Vancouver prior to her musical career. Maria's background is Spanish. Her father was once a bull fighter in Spain.

Back to the Garden - A Tribute to Joni Mitchell (1992 Intrepid Records) included the song 'Blonde In The Bleachers' by Squiddly featuring Maria Del Mar.

In 1996 Maria joined the all-female rock band, Hassenpfeffer. They recorded an album, "Songs of Convenience" on the label MaGaDa International.

She is sometimes confused with another Maria del Mar, a Canadian television and film actress. Furthering the confusion, the singer del Mar has occasionally taken acting roles in Canadian independent films, most notably the 1991 film The Events Leading Up to My Death. However, the actress del Mar has never worked professionally as a musician.

References

Year of birth missing (living people)
Living people
Canadian women rock singers
Musicians from Toronto
Canadian alternative rock musicians